A strongman is a type of an authoritarian political leader. Political scientists Brian Lai and Dan Slater identify strongman rule as a form of authoritarian rule characterized by autocratic dictatorships depending on military enforcement, as distinct from three other categories of authoritarian rule, specifically machine (oligarchic party dictatorships); bossism (autocratic party dictatorships); and juntas (oligarchic military dictatorships).

A 2014 study published in the Annual Review of Political Science journal found that strongmen and juntas are both more likely to engage in human rights violations and civil wars than civilian dictatorships. However, military strongmen are more belligerent than military regimes or civilian dictatorships—i.e., they are more likely to initiate interstate armed conflict. It is theorized that this is because strongmen have greater reason to fear assassination, imprisonment, or exile after being removed from power. The rule of military strongmen is more likely to end through an insurgency, popular uprising, or invasion; by contrast, the rule of military regimes and civilian dictatorships are more likely to end in democratization.

List

Leaders that have been classified by political scientists as strongmen include:

  Ilham Aliyev
  Hafez al-Assad
  Gurbanguly Berdimuhamedow 
  Idi Amin
  Siad Barre
  Nayib Bukele
  Recep Tayyip Erdoğan 
  Adolf Hitler
  Saddam Hussein
  Salah Jadid
  Lee Kuan Yew
  Xi Jinping
  Chiang Kai-shek
  Ayub Khan
  Vladimir Lenin
  Alexander Lukashenko
  Ferdinand Marcos
  Ioannis Metaxas
  Narendra Modi 
  Benito Mussolini
  Gamal Abdel Nasser
  Nursultan Nazarbayev
  Manuel Noriega
  Viktor Orbán
  Juan Domingo Perón
  Augusto Pinochet
  Pol Pot
  Vladimir Putin
  Emomali Rahmon
  Mobutu Sese Seko
  Hun Sen
  Joseph Stalin
  Suharto 
  Omar Torrijos
  Getúlio Vargas
  Mao Zedong

See also

 Big man
 Bonapartism
 Caesarism
 Caudillo
 Cult of personality
 Despotism
 Dictatorship

 Duce
 Illiberal democracy
 Junta
 Managed democracy
 Political boss
 President for Life
 Warlord

References

Authoritarianism
Political terminology